Zvezda LLC is a Russian manufacturer of  plastic scale models of airplanes, military vehicles, helicopters, ships and cars. The company was founded in 1990 by Konstantin Krivenko to produce accurate scale model kits with attention to detail.

History
In 1990 the company started selling its first model kit dedicated to the Soviet Army. 

The company reproduces under licence of Boeing, Tupolev, Kamov, Sukhoi and MiG, some of their models are in the liveries of famous airlines such as Aeroflot and Utair.

See also
Model aircraft

Note

External links
 Zvezda official website

Model manufacturers of Russia
1:18 scale models
Manufacturing companies based in Moscow